Muhammad ʿImāra (8 December 1931, 1350 A.H. – 28 February 2020, 1441 A.H.) was an Islamic thinker, an author and editor, as well as a member of al-Azhar's Academy of Islamic research in Cairo.

Works
Muhammad Imara authored "more than one hundred books on Islamic philosophy, the Quran, politics, and intellectual issues", including:
 Tayarat al-fikr al-Islami 
 al-Tahrir al-Islamiy lilmar'ah
 al-Imam Muhammad 'Abduh: Mujadid al-dunya bitajdid al-din
 al-Islam wa huquq al-Insan: Darurat la Huquq
 al-Islām wa’l-ʿaqalliyyāt
 al-Gharb wa'l-Islam: ayn al-khatta' wa-ayn al-sawab?

See also
 Mohammad Salim Al-Awa
 Mohammed al-Ghazali
 Yusuf al-Qaradawi

References

See The Prophet's Pulpit: Commentaries on the State of Islam (Volume 1, page 193) by Khaled Abou El Fadl where he writes on and honors the life of Muhammad Imara.

1931 births
2020 deaths
Academic staff of Al-Azhar University
Egyptian Muslim scholars of Islam
Egyptian writers
Egyptian editors